Spawn is an action-adventure video game developed and published by Konami for the Game Boy Color, based on the Spawn comic book character. The game was noted for its extensive use of digitized speech in cutscenes, a largely uncommon feature in games for the system.

Plot
Special agent Al Simmons is tricked by his military team and assassinated. After being sent to Hell, Simmons makes a deal with the demon, Malebolgia, to get revenge by leading Hell's army to, and on, Earth. However, the deal is twisted, and Simmons becomes a minion of Hell, stripped of his name and rank, and now referred to only as Spawn. Rather than accept this fate, Spawn searches for the opportunity to free himself from his misguided deal. This leads to the rebirth of Spawn (with Violator as well) as in the chapters of the comic books by Todd McFarlane. The story completely revolves around Spawn and the growth of his power.

Reception

The game received "mixed" reviews, according to video game review aggregator GameRankings.

The game shipped 1.6 million units in the U.S on the first day of its release.

References

External links 
 

1999 video games
Game Boy Color games
Game Boy Color-only games
Konami games
Video games about demons
Video games based on Spawn (comics)
Superhero video games
Video games developed in Japan